Nelly Attar is a Lebanese/Saudi mountaineer. She became the first Arab woman to summit K2 in 2022. She is also the first Lebanese woman to scale Ama Dablam (Nepal, 2021) and Matterhorn.  (Swiss Alps, 2022). Nelly has scaled 23 peaks, including Mount Everest. in 2019. 

She is heavily involved in the sports landscape across the GCC, and is the owner of Saudi Arabia's first dance studio, MOVE.

Early life
Attar is a Saudi-born Lebanese. She completed her academic studies in Psychology and was awarded a B.Sc. from the American University of Beirut, and MRes from Kingston University in London. She started her career as a psychologist and life coach. Attar later shifted careers to follow her passion for fitness and physical activity.

Dance Studio
Nelly Attar launched MOVE in 2017, during the time Saudi started undergoing national transformation. MOVE is the first dance studio in Saudi Arabia.

Athletic activities
Nelly Attar has scaled 23+ peaks globally since 2015. She has also completed 6 Marathons, a dozen triathlons, and 1 ultramarathon; Hajar trail race.

Mountain Climbing
Nelly started her mountain climbing journey in 2007, when she climbed Mount Kenya. She thereafter turned this in experience into a climbing career regularly climbing mountains since 2015, when she climbed Kliminjaro in 2015 and Elbrus in 2016.

In 2017, Nelly scaled multiple mountains including Aconcagua, Mont Blanc, Gran Paradiso, Mount Speke and Mount Stanley. The following year she climbed Kilimanjaro again, Lenin Peak, Island Peak and Lobuche. 

In 2019, Nelly along with three other Arab Women, Joyce Azzam, Mona Shahab and Nadhirah Alharthy, climbed the Everest. 

In 2021 Nelly scaled Denali (turning back 100m from the summit), and Ama Dablam. In 2022, Nelly scaled K2, Briethorn Traverse, and the Matterhorn. 

Nelly has claimed a couple of firsts in her mountaineering journey - becoming the first Arab woman to Summit the K2 (Pakistan) in 2022, first Arab woman to summit Mount Stanley and Speke (Uganda) in 2017, and the first Lebanese Woman to climb Ama Dablam (Nepal) and Matterhorn (Swiss Alps).

References

External links 
 Website: Nelly Attar

Living people
Arab women
Lebanese mountain climbers
Female climbers